Ocean floor disposal is a method of sequestering radioactive waste in ocean floor sediment where it is unlikely to be disturbed either geologically or by human activity.

Several methods of depositing material in the ocean floor have been proposed, including encasing it in concrete and as the United Kingdom has previously done, dropping it in torpedoes designed to increase the depth of penetration into the ocean floor, or depositing containers in shafts drilled with techniques similar to those used in oil exploration.

Ocean floor sediment is saturated with water, but since there is no water table per se and the water does not flow through it the migration of dissolved waste is limited to the rate at which it can diffuse through dense clay. This is slow enough that it could potentially take millions of years for waste to diffuse through several tens of meters of sediment so that by the time it reaches open ocean it would be highly dilute and decayed. Large regions of the ocean floor are thought to be completely geologically inactive and it is not expected that there will be extensive human activity there in the future.  Water absorbs essentially all radiation within a few meters provided the waste remains contained.

One of the problems associated with this option includes the difficulty of recovering the waste, if necessary, once it is emplaced deep in the ocean. Also, establishing an effective international structure to develop, regulate, and monitor a sub-seabed repository would be extremely difficult.

Beyond technical and political considerations, the London Convention places prohibitions on disposing of radioactive materials at sea and does not make a distinction between waste dumped directly into the water and waste that is buried underneath the ocean's floor. It remained in force until 2018, after which the sub-seabed disposal option can be revisited at 25-year intervals.

Depositing waste, in suitable containers, in subduction zones has also been suggested. Here, waste would be transported by plate tectonic movement into the Earth's mantle and rendered harmless through dilution and natural decay. Several objections have been raised to this method, including vulnerabilities during transport and disposal, as well as uncertainties in the actual tectonic processes.

See also
Horizontal drillhole disposal
Ocean disposal of radioactive waste
 Deep borehole disposal
 Yucca Mountain nuclear waste repository
 Waste Isolation Pilot Plant
 Nuclear fuel cycle
 Radioactive waste

References 

Radioactive waste
Waste treatment technology
Ocean pollution